Peter Lampman Yoder (March 5, 1940 – January 30, 2006) was an American football coach. He served as a running backs coach at the University of Southern California (USC) under John McKay before accepting the head coaching position at California State University, Fullerton, where he compiled an 18–15 record in three seasons (1972–1974). He later coached at Esperanza High School in Anaheim, California, going 99–35–6 from 1979 to 1986.  Yoder died of brain cancer on January 30, 2006, in Austin, Texas.

Head coaching record

College

References

1940 births
2006 deaths
Cal State Fullerton Titans football coaches
USC Trojans football coaches
High school football coaches in California
Deaths from brain cancer in the United States